Conae may refer to:

CONAE,  Argentina space agency
7213 Conae main belt asteroid